Baron Charles de Geer (the family is usually known as De Geer with a capitalized "De" and is pronounced "de yer"); Finspång in Risinge 30 January 1720 – Stockholm 7 March 1778) was a Swedish industrialist and entomologist.

Life 
De Geer, who came from a family with strong Dutch connections, grew up in Utrecht from the age of three. He returned to Sweden at the age of 19. He had inherited the entailed manor and important iron-works of Leufsta (Lövsta) in Uppland from his childless uncle and namesake and would substantially increased the wealth of the estate.

Ever since he had received a present of some silk worms at the age of eight, he had an interest in entomology and became a respected amateur entomologist at an early age. His major work was the Mémoires pour servir à l'histoire des insectes (eight volumes, 1752-1778). He was elected a member of the Royal Swedish Academy of Sciences already in 1739, at the age of nineteen, and a corresponding member of the French Academy of Sciences in 1748.

He is buried with his spouse in Uppsala Cathedral. His collections of insects were donated to the Academy of Sciences and now belong to the Swedish Museum of Natural History in Stockholm. He left a library at Leufsta which, among other things, included the papers of Olaus Rudbeck and an important collection of 18th-century sheet music. The Leufsta library was acquired by Uppsala University Library in 1986 after a donation by Katarina Crafoord (one of the daughters of Holger Crafoord, the founder of Gambro).

Achievements 
De Geer was a great admirer of René Antoine Ferchault de Réaumur. Hence his modelling Mémoires pour servir à l'histoire des insectes on Réaumur's work of the same title. It, too, is in French, similarly in large quarto and with the same decorations. The Mémoires deal with 1,466 species, treating life histories, food and reproduction based on careful, patient investigation and analysis of existing literature. There are 238 copper plates. The descriptions are acutely observed.

In nomenclature De Geer was less progressive; Volume 1 of the Mémoires (1752) was too early to employ the binomial system invented by his fellow Swede Carl Linnaeus. Volume 2 (1771) did not use it, but in volumes 3 (1773) to 7 (1778) the Linnean system was employed. However, for many species De Geer used two or more words for a specific name, such as Aphis betulae nigro punctata, these names were not binomial in the Linnean sense. He also proposed new names for many species which had previously been named and described by Linnaeus. It seems that using Linnean names was a concession to usage as in the 1760s and 1770s the Linnean system became increasingly employed, not because De Geer liked the new system. They had differences "not everyone sees things in the same light, and people have the weakness of frequently being too fond of their own opinions" (letter to Linnaeus 16 October 1772) and "if here and there I am still of a different opinion, I am now, as before, asking you not to take it amiss" (letter to Linnaeus 23 February 1774).

Works 
Tal om nyttan, som Insecterne och deras skärskådande, tilskynda oss, ... Stockholm 1744–47. 
Mémoires pour servir à l'histoire des insectes. Grefing & Hesselberg, Stockholm 1752–78. 
Tal, om insecternas alstring. Stockholm 1754. 
Abhandlungen zur Geschichte der Insecten. Müller & Raspe, Leipzig, Nürnberg 1776-83 p.m. 
Genera et species insectorum. Crusium, Leipzig 1783 p.m.

Common insects described by De Geer 
Camponotus pennsylvanicus, the black carpenter ant (Hymenoptera: Formicidae)
Dermestes maculatus, a skin beetle, Coleoptera 1774
Xestobium rufovillosum, the death watch beetle, Coleoptera 1774
Meconema thalassinum, oak bush-cricket, Orthoptera 1773 Picture
Gasterophilus intestinalis, horse botfly, Diptera 1776
Episyrphus balteatus, a hoverfly, Diptera 1776
Triatoma rubrofasciata, Triatominae, Hemiptera 1773
Erythrodiplax unimaculata, a dragonfly, Odonata 1773
Anasa tristis, squash bug, Hemiptera
Hepialus (Korscheltellus) fusconebulosa, map-winged swift moth, Lepidoptera 1778
Microctenochira quadrata , Cassidinae, Coleoptera 1775

References and further research 
Anfält, Tomas (1991): Consumer of enlightenment. Charles De Geer  -  savant and book collector in eighteenth-century Sweden. The Book Collector 1991, part 2, 197-210.
Duncan, James (1804-1861): Introduction to entomology. Lizars, Edinburgh 1840.
Pont, A.C. (1996): Some reflections on the history of systematic Dipterology. Dipterists Digest, Series 2, 2: 49–70.
Ekland, Karl Johan & Hamberg, Erik (ed.) (2018) En liten bok om Lövstabruk [in Swedish, English, German and French]. Uppsala.
Degeer's insect collection, without the original labels and not in the original cabinet may be found at the Swedish Museum of Natural History.

External links 
Charles de Geer Mémoires pour servir à l'histoire des insectes, digital facsimile at the Gallica website.
Gaedike, R.; Groll, E. K. & Taeger, A. 2012: Bibliography of the entomological literature from the beginning until 1863: online database - version 1.0 - Senckenberg Deutsches Entomologisches Institut.

References 

1720 births
1778 deaths
18th-century Swedish businesspeople
18th-century Swedish zoologists
Swedish entomologists
Hymenopterists
Swedish arachnologists
Members of the French Academy of Sciences
Members of the Royal Swedish Academy of Sciences
People from Finspång Municipality
Geer, Charles de

Utrecht University alumni
Swedish people of Belgian descent
Charles